The Church of São Salvador de Paderne is a Portuguese church in Paderne, Melgaço, the northernmost municipality in Portugal.

About 
The origins of the church are Romanesque, but it was subjected to significant alterations in the Baroque period.

Its architectural plan consists of a Latin cross, one short nave with a large transept.

The east side of the church has three rectangular chapels.

It has been classified by IPPAR as National Monument since 1910.

See also 
 Portuguese Romanesque architecture
 List of churches in Portugal

References

Sao Salvador Paderne
Buildings and structures in Melgaço, Portugal
National monuments in Viana do Castelo District

External links